The Special Contribution Award has been awarded by the Golden Bell Awards since 1980.

Winners

2020s

References

Special Contribution Award
Golden Bell Awards, Special Contribution Award